The cinema of Burma has a long history dating back to the 1910s. The person who created the first silent film was Ohn Maung (Burma's first producer and director).

Start of the Burmese cinema
Burma's first film was a recording of the funeral of Tun Shein - a leading politician of the 1910s, who campaigned for Burmese independence in London. It was captured with a second-hand camera by Ohn Maung and was screened at the Royal Cinema, near Scott Market (now Bogyoke Market), which belonged to a Mr Achar, a friend of Ohn Maung. Despite its documentary nature, the Burmese public was very proud of the film, which opened with the notice "Please accept our apologies for the poor quality of the film".

Ohn Maung then founded The Burma Film Company to produce and direct more films. He hired Nyi Pu (Burma's first actor) to shoot the first Burmese silent film Myitta Ne Thuya (Love and Liquor) which proved a major success, despite its poor quality due to a fixed camera position and inadequate film accessories. The film opened with the title "Burma Film Presents: Love and Liquor" but there were no credits or mention of the cast. It was based on a story by P Moe Nin about how gambling and alcohol destroyed a man's life. The day the film premiered, 13 October 1920, is commemorated annually as the Myanmar Movie Day.

Fox of America asked for Burmese nature study scenes and bought them from Ohn Maung. He also acquired more advanced film accessories and camera from the Kodak Company.

During the 1920s and 1930s, many Burmese-owned film companies (such as A1, New Burma, British Burma, The Imperial, Bandula and Yan Gyi Aung) made and produced several films. Some of the famous directors of this era were Nyi Pu, Sunny, Tote Kyi, and Tin Pe.

The first Burmese sound film was produced in 1932 in Bombay, India with the title Ngwe Pay Lo Ma Ya (Money Can't Buy It) and directed by Tote Kyi. Films dealing with social issues and political themes became popular in the 1930s. Parrot Film Company produced films that addressed social issues such as gambling and police corruption, although the films were censored by the British colonial government. There were also films that were banned like Do Daung Lan (Our Peacock Flag) in 1936 and Aung Thabyay (The Triumphant Jambul) in 1937. The political film Boycott was directed by the student leader Ko Nu in 1937 and starred other student leaders such as Aung San and Htun Ohn. The censors allowed this film to be shown.

Many of the films from this era no longer exist due to the lack of adequate preservation.

Cold War era 
After World War II, Burmese cinema continued to address political themes. Many of the films produced in the early Cold War era had a strong propaganda element to them. The film Palè Myetyay (Tear of Pearl), produced in the wake of the Kuomintang invasion of Burma in the 1950s, highlighted the importance of the armed forces or Tatmadaw to the country. Ludu Aung Than (The People Win Through) featured anti-Communist propaganda. The script was written by U Nu who served as Prime Minister during the 1950s.

The famous film maker and author Thukha started producing films during this period. His most famous film is Bawa Thanthaya (The Life Cycle). Burma held its first Academy Awards in 1952. Starting with the Socialist era in 1962, there was strict censorship and control of film scripts.

Recent history 
In the era that followed the political events of 1988, the film industry has been increasingly controlled by the government. After the 1989 move by the government to open up the economy, the movie industry was privatised. The film company Mingala became the most powerful company in the industry. Film stars who had been involved in the political activities of the 1980s and 1990s, such as Aung Lwin and Tun Wai, were banned from appearing in films. The films of some directors such as Win Pe have also been banned. The government issues strict rules on censorship and largely determines who produces films, as well as who gets academy awards.

Over the years, the movie industry has also shifted to producing many lower budget direct-to-video films.

Most of the movies produced nowadays are comedies. In 2008, only 12 films worthy of being considered for an Academy Award were made, although at least 800 VCDs were produced.

Another issue plaguing the Burmese cinema is a steep decline in the number of theatres in which to screen the films. According to a December 2011 survey, the number of theatres nationwide had declined to just 71 from their peak of 244. The survey also found that most were several-decade-old ageing theatres, and that only six "mini-theaters" had been built in 2009–2011. Moreover, the vast majority of the theatres were located in Yangon and Mandalay alone.

Recently Myanmar cinema got visibility in international film festivals. In 2014, The Maw Naing's The Monk was premiered at the 49th Karlovy Vary International Film Festival. Followed by the participation in main competitions as; Wera Aung's short film The Robe at 21st Busan International Film Festival,  Aung Phyoe's Cobalt Blue at 72nd Locarno Film Festival. and Maung Sun's Money Has Four Legs at 74th Locarno Film Festival.

In 2019, some local media reported a revival in the local movie industry, stating that in 2016 there were 12 movies cleared by local censorship and waiting to be screened,  18 in 2017, more than 40 in 2018, and more than  60 in 2019. The success of Now and Ever (2019), starring Zenn Kyi, was also cited as evidence of the revival. According to The Myanmar Times, the most successful Myanmar movie in 2019 was The Only Mom, directed in Myanmar by Thai director Chartchai Ketnust, starring Burmese actress Wutt Hmone Shwe Yi and telling the story of a family that moved into a colonial-era haunted house. The movie also starred a real Burmese Spiritualist medium, U Hla Aye, who died after his part of the shooting was done.

Burmese film companies

 Z Productions (Formerly Akhuka Productions)
 Akaya Production
 Arkar production
 Like Art Creation
 Magical Creation Myanmar
 Amyotha
 Artint media production
 BAHUGEN Pictures
 Barani
 Bridge
 Central base production
 Chitthu
 Country Star
 Dawei
 8K Film
 Everest
 EM Production
 Green Age Film Production
 Harmony Light
 HD Production Team
 Hlaing film production
 Kadipayinkyin
 Khin Sabe Oo film production
 Kyemon
 Kyaw Zay
 Kyaytagon
 Lin
 Lucky Seven
 LuSwankung
 Magic Factory Production
 Ma Ha Htun
 Malikha
 Mittayangpyan
 Moe Kaungkin
 Myanma Motion Picture Enterprise
 Myatharaphu
 Myintmitta
 Myo
 National Network Inc.
 Nawarat
 New Htat Tang
 Novel
 Ohtthaphaya
 One of those Hearts
 Pan Wai Wai
 Papermoon
 Pataukpinlan
 Phoenix
 Pon Taung Myay
 Pyiphyomyat
 Red Radiance
 Sein Htay
 Sein War Ni
 Sein Tharaphu
 Shutter Productionn
 Shwe Taung
 Shwe Zin Oo
 Snow White
 Synthesis Productions (local/international)
 10A Production
 Thazin
 Third Eye
 Thirithanda
 Thukha May
 Wah Wah Win Shwe
 Yamona
 Ye Kyaw Thu
 YMT Productions
 Ywat Sein
 Vision Production
 Zan
 Zinyaw

Films

See also
 Cinema of the world
 Southeast Asian cinema
 Wathann Film Fest

References 
 Charney, Michael W. (2009) "Ludu Aung Than: Nu's Burma During the Cold War," in Christopher E. Goscha & Christian F. Ostermann (ed.), Connecting Histories: Decolonization and the Cold War in Southeast Asia, 1945-1962 (Washington, DC & Stanford California: Woodrow Wilson Center Press & Stanford University Press): 335–355. See also Michael W. Charney (2010), U Nu, China and the "Burmese" Cold War: Propaganda in Burma in the 1950s," in Zheng Yangwen, Hong Liu, & Michael Szonyi (eds.), The Cold War in Asia: The Battle for Hearts and Minds (Leiden: Brill University Press): 41–58.
 Hunter, Edward (1957) The People Win Through: a play by U Nu (New York: Taplinger Publishing Co).
 History of Burmese Film by the Burmese Film Association.
 Myanmore Weekly Guide

Notes

External links 
 Film scripts in Burmese for some Burmese films, Minlouthamya Kyeinate [Do what you'd like], Be Bagyi Yeilou Mami [So Beautiful It Can't Be Painted], Sonyei Zatlan [Water Going Up-River]
 Burma film festival in Thailand
 Hollywood representations of Burma